Lak may refer to:

People
 Laks (Caucasus), an ethnic group of Dagestan, North Caucasus, Russia
 Lak (tribe), a Kurdish tribe in Iran and Turkey.
 Hamed Lak (born 1990), Iranian football goalkeeper
 Peter Lak (born 1973), American retired soccer defender

Places
 Lak, Dak Lak, Vietnam
 L'ak, a commune in Cambodia
 Lak, Hungary, a village
 Lak, Iran (disambiguation), various places
 Lək (disambiguation), places in Azerbaijan

Languages
 Lak language
 ISO 639-3 code for the Laka language (Nigeria)

Sports
 Los Angeles Kings, an ice hockey team based in Los Angeles, California

LAK
 Lao kip, ISO 4217 currency code
 Lymphokine-activated killer cell
 Aklavik/Freddie Carmichael Airport, Northwest Territories, Canada, IATA code
 Lakeland (Amtrak station), Florida, US, station code
 Lakenheath railway station, Suffolk, England, station code
 Lai King station, New Territories, Hong Kong, MTR station code 
 Liste der archaischen Keilschriftzeichen (1922), a dictionary of cuneiform signs
 Lietuviškos Aviacinės Konstrukcijos, Lithuanian/Soviet gliders, LAK-2, etc.
 Lycée Abdel Kader, a French international school in Beirut

See also
 Lakh, a unit in the Indian numbering system
 Lak Mueang, a Thai city pillar
 Lac (disambiguation)
 Lack (disambiguation)
 Laak (disambiguation)
 Lak Lak (disambiguation)
 Laks (disambiguation)

Language and nationality disambiguation pages